Restart may refer to:

Computing 
 Reboot (computing), the act of restarting a computer
 Reset (computing), bringing the system to normal condition or an initial state

Music 
 Restart (band), a Brazilian band
 Restart (Restart album), Restart's debut studio album
 Restart (Newsboys album), 2013
 Restart (Bilal song), 2010
 Restart (Nnadia Chan album), 2003
 "Restart" (Kotoko song), 2012
 The Restarts, a street punk band from London, England

Other 
 Restart (training course), a program in the United Kingdom for people who were long-term unemployed
 Re:START, a temporary shopping mall in Christchurch, New Zealand
 Restart, a novel by Gordon Korman.
 Restart (group), Iranian opposition group based in California, U.S.

See also 
 Booting
 Reboot (disambiguation)
 Reset (disambiguation)
 Restarter (disambiguation)
 Start (disambiguation)